Ford City is a borough in Armstrong County, Pennsylvania, United States,  northeast of Pittsburgh along the east bank of the Allegheny River and  south of Kittanning, the county seat. The population was 2,859 at the 2020 census. It is part of the Pittsburgh metropolitan area.

History

Ford City was founded in 1887 as a company town by the Pittsburgh Plate Glass Company (now PPG Industries) as the site for its Works No. 3 glass factory. The town was named in honor of the company founder, John Baptiste Ford (1811–1903). The factory employed as many as 5,000 workers in its heyday. PPG shut down its Ford City operations in the 1990s. The once largest employer in Armstrong County, Eljer Plumbing, shut down its Ford City plant in 2008.

Geography
Ford City is located at  (40.771410, -79.529906).

Climate

Demographics

As of the census of 2000, there were 3,451 people, 1,580 households, and 935 families residing in the borough. The population density was 4,864.8 people per square mile (1,876.7/km²). There were 1,713 housing units at an average density of 2,414.8 per square mile (931.5/km²). The racial makeup of the borough was 94.38% White, 3.88% African American, 0.14% Native American, 0.17% Asian, 0.14% from other races, and 1.27% from two or more races. Hispanic or Latino of any race were 0.75% of the population.

There were 1,580 households, out of which 25.3% had children under the age of 18 living with them, 40.3% were married couples living together, 13.8% had a female householder with no husband present, and 40.8% were non-families. 37.6% of all households were made up of individuals, and 21.6% had someone living alone who was 65 years of age or older. The average household size was 2.17 and the average family size was 2.84.

The borough median age of 42 years was more than the county median age of 40 years. The distribution by age group was 21.8% under the age of 18, 7.3% from 18 to 24, 25.4% from 25 to 44, 20.4% from 45 to 64, and 25.1% who were 65 years of age or older. The median age was 42 years. For every 100 females, there were 84.4 males. For every 100 females age 18 and over, there were 81.3 males.

The median income for a household in the borough was $24,457, and the median income for a family was $30,843. Males had a median income of $28,438 versus $21,919 for females. The per capita income for the borough was $14,318. About 13.5% of families and 13.4% of the population were below the poverty line, including 17.2% of those under age 18 and 5.0% of those age 65 or over.

Education
A part of the public Armstrong School District, Ford City has an elementary school and, in the past, had its own high school, Ford City Junior/Senior High School. Currently, students in Ford City aattend Lenape Elementary from kindergarten through sixth grade, and then Armstrong Junior/Senior High School in Manor Township from grades seven through twelve. Alternatively, students can attend Lenape Vocational Technical School beginning their junior year

The town's high school, Ford City Junior/Senior High School, included grades seven through twelve. FCHS opened its doors in 1909, awarding diplomas to its first graduating class of 4 students on May 10, 1910, and had its final graduating class in June 2015.  

The area's only Catholic elementary school, Divine Redeemer, is located on 4th Avenue in downtown Ford City.

Parks and recreation

Ford City Memorial Park, located on 4th Avenue between 8th and 9th Streets, features an 1891 bronze statue of John B. Ford, by Hartford, Connecticut sculptor Carl Conrads. The park also features a gazebo and a war memorial dedicated to the men and women of Ford City who served in the United States military. The 7th Avenue Playground, located at the northern end of 7th Avenue between 12th and 13th Streets, was upgraded with new playground equipment in 2017. The playground features a half-court basketball court, a covered pavilion, new playground equipment and a large field equipped with a baseball backstop. Boulder Park, located at the southern end of 6th Avenue between 5th and 6th Streets, was also upgraded with new playground equipment in 2017. The park features a full-court lighted basketball court, a covered pavilion and new playground equipment. It was announced in early 2018 that the basketball court would be completely renovated, allowing for the addition of deck hockey to be played on the court.

The 36-mile-long Armstrong Trail is located on the former Allegheny Valley Railroad line along the eastern bank of the Allegheny River in Armstrong & Clarion Counties. The trail links Ford City, Kittanning and East Brady.

In popular culture
 The television show American Pickers aired an episode on August 19, 2012 (Season 7, Ep. 2) that consisted of a visit to the Mantini Funeral Home in Ford City as well as several other locations owned by the Mantini brothers. 
 Several scenes of the 2009 horror film My Bloody Valentine 3D were shot in Ford City.  
 The borough was referenced in a scene of the cult classic Night of the Living Dead.  
 Ford City is one setting for the 1983 novel A Country Such as This by James H. Webb, now a former U.S. senator from Virginia.
 It is used by the writer Frank Brookhouser in his books Request for Sherwood Anderson (1947) and She Made the Big Town (1952). 
 A pictorial history, Around Ford City (2008), was written by William L. Oleksak.
Ford City was the setting for a scene in Episode 7 of NBC's apocalyptic television series Revolution, which aired in November 2012. The main characters initially attempt to cross a bridge over the Allegheny River in nearby Freeport, Pennsylvania, but they are ambushed and turned back. The main characters then decide to attempt a bridge crossing in Ford City, but are again unsuccessful.

Notable people
David Coulter, banker
Gus Frerotte, NFL Quarterback 
Raymond Harvey, Medal of Honor recipient
John F. Hunter, Ohio congressman
Tim Levcik, American football player
Abby Major, member of the Pennsylvania House of Representatives
Zigmund "Red" Mihalik, Hall of Fame basketball official
Albert Pechan, Pennsylvania state senator
Chris Valasek, computer security expert
Michael Yates, economist and magazine editor

See also
 List of crossings of the Allegheny River

References

External links
Borough of Ford City official website

Populated places established in 1887
Pittsburgh metropolitan area
Company towns in Pennsylvania
Boroughs in Armstrong County, Pennsylvania
1889 establishments in Pennsylvania
Ukrainian communities in the United States
PPG Industries